Six Lectures About Loneliness is a 2009 non-fiction book by Chian Hsun, a professor at the Chinese Culture University. The book discusses the concept of loneliness and how it affects different aspects of humanity.

Synopsis
In the book the author splits loneliness into six parts, the flesh, language, revolution, thinking, ethics, and violence. Hsun believes that loneliness is necessary, but that the fear of it could make things worse. The author also challenges the concept of language meanings, saying that words can be ignored or misinterpreted by others, contributing to the feeling of loneliness.

References

2009 non-fiction books
Aesthetics books